Every Time Two Fools Collide is a 1978 duet album by country music singers Kenny Rogers and Dottie West.

This was the duo's first album together,  after Rogers entered the country market earlier with his massive country pop crossover hit "Lucille" in spring of 1977, followed by a string of more big crossover hits. West, though, was struggling to keep afloat as a country singer, and needed help to bring her career back to where she was in the early part of the decade. Together, they recorded and released this album in 1978, and it was certified gold by the RIAA. The album spawned two big country hits; the title track went to number one (see the "Every Time Two Fools Collide" song article), followed up by the number-two hit "Anyone Who Isn't Me Tonight". The album went to number one on the Top Country albums chart for two weeks, and went to number 186 on the Billboard 200. It has sold over one million copies worldwide.

Track listing
"Every Time Two Fools Collide" (Jan Dyer, Jeff Tweel) - 3:00
"You and Me" (Roger Bowling, Larry Butler) - 2:57
"What's Wrong with Us Today" (Butler, Kenny Rogers, Dottie West) - 2:51
"Beautiful Lies" (Marianne Gordon, Milton Brown, Rogers) - 3:24
"That's the Way It Could've Been" (Tammy Wynette) - 3:04
"Why Don't We Go Somewhere and Love" (Kenny O'Dell, Larry Henley) - 2:47
"Baby I'm-a Want You" (David Gates) - 2:34
"Anyone Who Isn't Me Tonight" (Julie Didier, Casey Kelly) - 2:20
"The Loving Gift" (Kris Kristofferson) - 2:23
"We Love Each Other" (Buddy Killen) - 2:49

Personnel
Compiled from liner notes

 Kenny Rogers – vocals
 Dottie West – vocals

Musicians
 Hargus "Pig" Robbins – Fender Rhodes
 Bobby Wood – Fender Rhodes
 Jimmy Capps – guitar
 Ray Edenton – guitar
 Billy Sanford – guitar
 Pete Wade – guitar
 Pete Drake – steel guitar
 Tommy Allsup – six-string bass guitar
 Bob Moore – upright bass
 Jerry Carrigan – drums
 Buddy Harman – drums
 The Jordanaires – backing vocals
 Bill Justis – string arrangements
 Strings – Sheldon Kurland, Byron Bach, George Binkley, Martin Chantry, Roy Christensen, Carl Gorodetzly, Lennie Haight, Marvin Katahn, Wilfred Lehmann, Steven Smith, Samuel Terranova, Gary Vanosdale

Production
 Larry Butler – producer
 Billy Sherrill – engineer
 Bob Sowell – mastering at Master Control (Nashville, Tennessee).
 Bill Burks – art direction
 Jeff Lancaster – design 
 Gary Regester – photography 
 Ken Kragen – management

Chart performance

Album

Singles

References

1978 albums
Dottie West albums
Kenny Rogers albums
Vocal duet albums
United Artists Records albums
Albums arranged by Bill Justis
Albums produced by Larry Butler (producer)